John De Gruchy  is a Canadian motorcycle racer who was active from 1957 until his retirement in 1974. De Gruchy was inducted into the Canadian Motorsport Hall of Fame in 2005.

References

Canadian motorcycle racers
Living people
Place of birth missing (living people)
1935 births